Ahmed Yousef Elkawiseh (also transliterated Ahmed Youssif El-Kawiseh, born 24 March 1989 in Tripoli) is a Libyan judoka. At the 2012 Summer Olympics he competed in the men's 66 kg, but after a bye in the first round was defeated in the second round by Mirzahid Farmonov.

References

External links
 
 
 

1989 births
Living people
Libyan male judoka
Olympic judoka of Libya
Judoka at the 2012 Summer Olympics
People from Tripoli, Libya